The Poker Creek–Little Gold Creek Border Crossing is located on the Top of the World Highway, which connects the communities of Chicken, Alaska and Dawson, Yukon on the Canada–United States border. This crossing is notable for being the northernmost international border crossing in North America.

History
In 2001, the US and Canada constructed a joint border inspection station, where inspectors from both countries occupy a single facility. A line painted on the floor in the building marks the US-Canada border.

See also
 List of Canada–United States border crossings

References

Buildings and structures in Southeast Fairbanks Census Area, Alaska
Buildings and structures in Yukon
Canada–United States border crossings
1971 establishments in Alaska
1971 establishments in Yukon